Middleton Scriven is a civil parish in Shropshire, England.  It contains three listed buildings that are recorded in the National Heritage List for England.  All the listed buildings are designated at Grade II, the lowest of the three grades, which is applied to "buildings of national importance and special interest".  The parish contains the village of Middleton Scriven and the surrounding countryside.  All the listed buildings are in the village, and consist of a timber framed house, a farmhouse, and a church.


Buildings

References

Citations

Sources

Lists of buildings and structures in Shropshire